Cascia High School is located in Jeppu near Mangaladevi Temple in Mangalore run by the Cascia St Rita's Church, Jeppu. Mahanavami Katta (of Mangala Devi) is located within the school compound.

It recently completed 60 years of its service to the society in 2006.

It offers high school education in both English & Kannada mediums under the Karnataka board of secondary education. This school has around 800 students

History 
This school was established by parish priest of St Rita’s church Fr F X Fernandes on 3 June 1946.

Monsignor F X Fernandes, Fr A J D'Silva, Fr J M Menezes, Fr Thomas D'Sa, Fr J I Saldanha, Fr Robert M Pinto, Fr Aloysius P D'Souza (the present Bishop of Mangalore Diocese) and Fr Denis D'Souza have served as school conveners for this great institute.

Its first headmaster was Manjeshwar Purushottam Kini, followed by Fr Fredrick Fernandes and Kateel Govind Pai.

In 1950, it became a full-fledged high school and within a years time built a four-class room building. The society took the school to be its own and thus the generous support resulted in erecting another building for the school. By 1966, a night school was operating from this building. In 1968 the school became a higher secondary school.

The school comes under the administration of the Catholic Education Board while school convener, parish priest and School Development and Managing Committee manage its overall administration.

Since then, the school has been rendering education to thousands of students, without the distinction of caste, religion and class. It has been striving for the integral development of the area through offering excellent moral education and inculcating Patriotism.

Alumni from the school have adorned higher positions and have earned good reputation in various fields.

Present 

At present the school has both Kannada and English medium classes functioning from VIII to X std. There are four divisions each in VIII and IX and three divisions in X std, wherein both boys and girls around 700 in number are provided with the education.

The school has been securing more than 90 per cent results in SSLC public examinations for many years.

Cascia High School has carved a niche for itself not only in the educational field, but also in all other fields. The students of the school have won many prizes in football, hockey, wrestling, yoga, and other sports activities and the school has the pride of representing State-level competitions in football, hockey and wrestling.

Extracurricular activities are conducted in schools to ensure personality development of the students There is an NCC unit, Guides, Literary Club, Science Club, Arts Club, Y S M, Kannada Club and UNESCO Club besides computer education classes.

Steven D'Souza, Fr William Fernandes, Fr Lawrence D'Souza and Saturnine Mascarenhas have served as headmasters while Rita Rodrigues, who has been serving as a teacher in the school, for the past 25 years, is the present school head.

Institutions run by Cascia St Rita's Church, Jeppu 
 1. St Rita's English higher primary school (Co-ed)
 2. St Rita's Kannada Higher Primary School (Girls)
 3. St John's Kannada Higher Primary School (Boys)
 4. Bal Christ Kindergarten SChool (co-ed)
 5. Cascia High School (Co-ed)

All these institutions are located close to each other with separate campuses in Jeppu.

In total, there are about 3000 students studying in this group of institutions.

References 

Schools in Mangalore
High schools and secondary schools in Karnataka
Christian schools in Karnataka
Educational institutions established in 1946
1946 establishments in India